"Atmosphere" is a song by the American record producer Kaskade. It was released on 10 June 2013, through Ultra Music, as the second single from his tenth studio album Atmosphere. The song was nominated for the 2014 Grammy Award for Best Dance Recording.

Music video
A music video to accompany the release of "Atmosphere" was first released onto YouTube on 27 June 2013 at a total length of four minutes and thirteen seconds.

Track listings

Chart performance

Weekly charts

Year-end charts

Release history

References

2013 singles
2013 songs
Kaskade songs
Ultra Music singles
Songs written by Kaskade
Songs written by Finn Bjarnson